Jesse Baker may refer to:

 Jesse Baker (American football) (Jesse Lewis Baker; 1957–1999), American football player
 Jesse Baker (shortstop) (Michael Myron Silverman; 1895–1976), American baseball player
 Jesse Baker (pitcher) (Jesse Ormond Baker; 1888–1972), American baseball player
 Jesse Matlack Baker (1854–1913), American politician

See also
Jessica Baker, fictional character in Cheaper by the Dozen